William (Bill) Schaake (30 July 1930 – September 8, 2017) was an American football coach active at the high school and college levels between 1954 and 1975.

Coaching career
Bill Schaake served as the head football coach at Abilene High School (KS) 1954-56, Shawnee Mission East High School (KS) 1957-58, Goodland High School (KS) 1960-1964 and Evergreen High School (CO) 1973-75 compiling a career high school football record of 60-50-7. His 1964 Goodland High School team was undefeated (9-0) and won the Kansas Class A State Championship.  He had one-year stints as an assistant football coach at Wichita State University in 1959 and Kansas University in 1966.  He served as the head football coach at Minot State Teachers College—now known as Minot State University—in 1965 and at Washburn University from 1967 to 1968, compiling a career college football record of 7–18–1.

Head coaching record

College

References

2017 deaths
Kansas Jayhawks football coaches
Kansas Jayhawks football players
Kansas Jayhawks men's basketball players
Minot State Beavers football coaches
Washburn Ichabods football coaches
Wichita State Shockers football coaches
High school football coaches in Kansas
United States Air Force officers
Kansas State University alumni
People from Jefferson County, Kansas
Sportspeople from Lawrence, Kansas
Players of American football from Kansas
People from Ellensburg, Washington
American men's basketball players
Year of birth uncertain